Mathew Luke Kennelly  (born 21 March 1989) is an Australian professional baseball catcher. He is the younger brother of Timothy Kennelly.

International competition
Kennelly appeared for Australia in both the 2009 Baseball World Cup and the 2013 World Baseball Classic.

References

External links

1989 births
Living people
Australian expatriate baseball players in the United States
Baseball catchers
Baseball people from Western Australia
Gulf Coast Braves players
Danville Braves players
Gwinnett Braves players
Louisville Bats players
Mississippi Braves players
Myrtle Beach Pelicans players
Pensacola Blue Wahoos players
Perth Heat players
Phoenix Desert Dogs players
Rome Braves players
2013 World Baseball Classic players
Sportspeople from Fremantle
Sportsmen from Western Australia